The Alid Volcano is a stratovolcano located in the Northern Red Sea region of Eritrea in the Danakil Depression. The volcano's most recent activity was identified in 1928, when it emitted smoke. It is a large volcano located in the northern east coast.

See also
List of volcanoes in Eritrea
List of stratovolcanoes

References 
 

Mountains of Eritrea
Stratovolcanoes of Eritrea
Active volcanoes
Rift volcanoes